In geometry, a space diagonal (also interior diagonal or body diagonal) of a polyhedron is a line connecting two vertices that are not on the same face. Space diagonals contrast with face diagonals, which connect vertices on the same face (but not on the same edge) as each other.

For example, a pyramid has no space diagonals, while a cube (shown at right) or more generally a parallelepiped has four space diagonals.

Axial diagonal
An axial diagonal is a space diagonal that passes through the center of a polyhedron.

For example, in a cube with edge length a, all four space diagonals are axial diagonals, of common length  More generally, a cuboid  with edge lengths a, b, and c has all four space diagonals axial, with common length 

A regular octahedron has 3 axial diagonals, of length , with edge length a. 

A regular icosahedron has 6 axial diagonals of length , where  is the golden ratio .

Space diagonals of magic cubes

A magic square is an arrangement of numbers in a square grid so that the sum of the numbers along every row, column, and diagonal is the same.  Similarly, one may define a magic cube to be an arrangement of numbers in a cubical grid so that the sum of the numbers on the four space diagonals must be the same as the sum of the numbers in each row, each column, and each pillar.

See also
 Distance
 Face diagonal
 Magic cube classes
 Hypotenuse
 Spacetime interval

References

 John R. Hendricks, The Pan-3-Agonal Magic Cube, Journal of Recreational Mathematics 5:1:1972, pp 51–54. First published mention of pan-3-agonals
 Hendricks, J. R., Magic Squares to Tesseracts by Computer, 1998, 0-9684700-0-9, page 49
 Heinz & Hendricks, Magic Square Lexicon: Illustrated, 2000, 0-9687985-0-0, pages 99,165
 Guy, R. K. Unsolved Problems in Number Theory, 2nd ed. New York: Springer-Verlag, p. 173, 1994.

External links 
 
  de Winkel Magic Encyclopedia
 Heinz - Basic cube parts
 John Hendricks Hypercubes

Magic squares
Elementary geometry